The Crown and Parliament Recognition Act 1689 (2 Will & Mary c 1) was an Act of the Parliament of England, passed in 1690. It was designed to confirm the succession to the throne of King William III and Queen Mary II of England and to confirm the validity of the laws passed by the Convention Parliament which had been irregularly convened following the Glorious Revolution and the end of James II's reign.

This Act is still wholly in force in England and Wales.

Reason for the Act

The Act was passed because in 1688 King James II of England was deposed (he was deemed to have abdicated) and replaced as king by William and Mary, who ruled jointly. However this could not be achieved without an Act of Parliament to approve it. Since no parliament was in existence at the time, it was necessary to convene one, but under the constitution only the King could summon a parliament. In the absence of a king to do so, the members of the previous parliament convened a new one themselves, without a royal summons, instead asking William to issue the summons, which he did on 22 January 1689. This irregular Parliament sat on 13 February. They declared James to have abdicated, and then chose Mary (his daughter) and William (her husband and first cousin) to succeed him, and passed an Act to make it legal. This Act was the Bill of Rights 1689. (In Scotland a separate Act was passed, the Claim of Right, which stated that James had forfeited the throne by his illegal actions and his failure to take the coronation oath.)

However, doubts arose as to the validity of the Bill of Rights and the other Acts passed by the Convention Parliament. Since the Parliament had not been summoned in the regular way, it was arguable that it was no parliament at all and its legislation was of no legal effect (although this occurrence was not unprecedented in English history). Therefore after the Convention Parliament was dissolved and the next parliament was summoned by the King and Queen in the normal manner, the Crown and Parliament Recognition Act was passed to confirm the validity of the royal succession and the previous parliament's legislative competence.

Controversy

The difficulty with the Act is that if the Convention Parliament had no authority, then the succession of William and Mary was of no legal effect, which meant that they were not capable of giving royal assent to any bill in the next parliament, with the result that even the Crown and Parliament Recognition Act was of no effect either. This very point was argued before the Hereford County Court in 1944 by a litigant who represented himself in a probate case called Hall v. Hall. He argued that the Court of Probate Act 1857 (which undermined his case) was of no legal effect whatsoever, since it had never received royal assent. It had received royal assent from Queen Victoria, but according to his argument Victoria had never legally inherited the throne, because the Bill of Rights and the Act of Settlement 1701 (which also altered the line of succession to the throne) were of no effect, since both had been assented to by William III, who was not the real king. Therefore Victoria had never been the real queen and so the Probate Act (like every other Act passed since 1689) was not the law. Predictably, the judge ruled against him, and the point has never been argued in court since.

Although the judge did not give detailed reasons for his decision, a counterpoint to the above argument has been advanced by academics: "One possible answer, deducible from rationalizations of later medieval practice when usurpations of the throne were not uncommon, is that ... [a]s a matter of State necessity ... a de facto King had been regarded as competent to summon a lawful Parliament."

Text of the Act

Ireland
In the Kingdom of Ireland another Act, entitled An Act of Recognition, of their Majesties  undoubted Right to the Crown of Ireland was passed in 1692 by the Parliament of Ireland, which made similar provision.  In the Republic of Ireland this was repealed by section 1 of, and the Schedule to, the Statute Law Revision (Pre-Union Irish Statutes) Act 1962.

See also
Treason Act 1702
Parliament Act 1660

References

External links
Official text of the Crown and Parliament Recognition Act 1689 as amended and in force today within the United Kingdom, from the UK Statute Law Database
Official text of the Crown Recognition Act (Ireland) 1692 as amended and in force today within the United Kingdom, from the UK Statute Law Database
"Of the King and His Title," chapter 3 of book 1 of the Commentaries on the Laws of England, William Blackstone, 1765

Acts of the Parliament of England
Acts of the Parliament of England still in force
Constitutional laws of England
1689 in law
1689 in England
Constitution of the United Kingdom